Erquitaia is a poorly known genus of prehistoric galeomorph shark whose fossils are found in rocks dating from the Maastrichtian stage.

Classification
Originally, Erquitaia was thought to be a ray placed in the order Rajiformes, however it was subsequently moved to the shark super order Galeomorphii, which includes all modern sharks except the dogfish and their relatives.

See also
 Flora and fauna of the Maastrichtian stage
 List of prehistoric cartilaginous fish (Chondrichthyes)

Cretaceous sharks
Prehistoric cartilaginous fish genera